Alfred Price FRHistS, (1936 - January 29, 2017) was a popular author on aviation and related topics. He wrote over 40 books and 200 magazine articles.

Early life and education 
Price served in the Royal Air Force (RAF) as an aircrew officer. Price received his PhD in history from Loughborough University.

Career 
After his retirement from the air force, Price wrote extensively on aviation and military topics. He was named a Fellow of the Royal Historical Society.

Selected works 
Pictorial History of the Luftwaffe 1933-1945. London: Allan, 1969. 
Focke Wulf 190 at War. New York: Scribner, 1977. 
Instruments of Darkness: The History of Electronic Warfare. London: Macdonald and Jane's, 1977. 
Battle of Britain 18 August 1940: The Hardest Day. London: Macdonald and Jane's, 1979. 
The Spitfire Story. London: Jane's, 1982. 
Air Battle Central Europe. New York: Warner Books, 1990. 
The Last Year of the Luftwaffe, May 1944 to May 1945. London: Arms and Armour, 1993. 
Late Marque Spitfire Aces: 1942-45. London: Osprey, 1995. 
Spitfire Mark V Aces, 1941-45. London: Osprey Aerospace, 1997. 
Sky Battles!: Dramatic Air Warfare Actions. London: Cassell, 1998, 1993. 
Targeting the Reich: Allied Photographic Reconnaissance Over Europe, 1939-1945. London: Greenhill, 2003.  
Battle Over the Reich: The Strategic Air Offensive Over Germany. Hersham: Classic, 2005.

Death and legacy 
He was diagnosed with Parkinson's disease and died on January 29, 2017.

References 

Historians of aviation
2017 deaths